Fistuliphragma is an extinct genus of cystoporate bryozoan of the family Fistuliporidae that lived in the Devonian period. Its colonies could have branched or encrusting forms, with hollow tubular branches in the case of the branched form, and possessed a well-developed vesicular skeleton. Its autozooecia possessed prominent lunaria and hemiphragms. The genus is distinct from Cliotrypa and Strotopora because of the absence of gonozooecia.

References

Prehistoric bryozoan genera
Cystoporida
Devonian